Anisopeplus is a genus of beetles in the family Cerambycidae, containing a single species, Anisopeplus perplexus. It was described by Melzer in 1934.

References

Desmiphorini
Beetles described in 1934
Monotypic Cerambycidae genera